Rajasthan College is a college in Jaipur city in Rajasthan state in India. Established in 1957 as "Government Rajasthan College", it is one of seven constituent colleges of University of Rajasthan. The college offers undergraduate courses in Arts. It is situated on Jawahar Lal Nehru Road. The college is also known as University Rajasthan College. Vivekanand Hostel a University hostel is associated hostel of the college. It is located at near by the commerce college.

References

External links
 colleges in Jaipur

Universities and colleges in Jaipur
University of Rajasthan
Educational institutions established in 1957
1957 establishments in Rajasthan
Educational institutions in India with year of establishment missing